Saint Rumon of Tavistock (also Ronan, Ruadan, or Ruan) is a saint venerated in the traditions of the Catholic, Anglican Communion, and Western Orthodox churches.

Biography 
Saint Rumon was likely a missionary originally from Ireland. According to Alban Butler, Rumon was a bishop, though it is not known of what see.

Antiquary John Leland said that a manuscript discovered at Tavistock at the time of the dissolution claimed that Rumon emigrated from Ireland in the fifth or sixth century and established a hermitage near Falmouth, Cornwall.

Some authorities believe him to be the same historical figure as St Ronan who is venerated in Brittany on 1 June. A 'Life of St. Rumon", likely written at Tavistock sometime between the twelfth and fourteenth centuries, adapts the Life of St. Ronan. Historian Nicholas Orme considers the only accurate part is that pertaining to Ruan Lanihorne and Tavistock.

Veneration

In 974, Ordulf, Earl of Devon, established the Abbey of Saint Mary and Saint Rumon at Tavistock. On 981, the relics of Saint Rumon, minus his head, were translated from the Celtic monastery at Ruan Lanihorne to Tavistock.

Henry I of England granted the abbey the privilege of a fair for three days at the feast of St. Rumon.

In the Catholic Church, the feast of St Rumon is observed on various dates in different British locations. The translation of St Rumon is celebrated on 5 January. The Holy Hierarch Rumon is venerated on 30 August according to the Julian Calendar in Western Orthodoxy.

Saint Rumon is the patron of Tavistock and Romansleigh in Devon and of Ruan Lanihorne in Cornwall. Ruan celebrates its patronal festival every year on the last Sunday in August.

Rumon is depicted as a bishop in a stained glass window in the Lady Chapel of St Eustachius' Church, Tavistock.
Several churches in Devon and Cornwall are named after him as well as the village of Romansleigh.

References

6th-century Irish priests
Christian missionaries in the United Kingdom
6th-century Christian saints
Christianity in Devon